A scientific demonstration is a procedure carried out for the purposes of demonstrating scientific principles, rather than for hypothesis testing or knowledge gathering (although they may originally have been carried out for these purposes).

Most scientific demonstrations are simple laboratory demonstrations intended to demonstrate physical principles, often in a surprising or entertaining way. They are carried out in schools and universities, and sometimes in public demonstrations in popular science lectures and TV programs aimed at the public. Many scientific demonstrations are chosen for their combination of educational merit and entertainment value, which is often provided by dramatic phenomena such as explosions.

Public scientific demonstrations were a common occurrence in the Age of Enlightenment, and have long  been a feature of the British Royal Institution Christmas Lectures, which date back to 1825. In the television era, scientific demonstrations have featured in science-related entertainment shows such as MythBusters and Brainiac: Science Abuse.

Examples
Some famous scientific demonstrations include:

 Archimedes experiments with relationship between  mass and volume(density)
 John Philoponus experiments with moving bodies and theory of impetus
 Antikythera mechanism and automaton robots built by ancient Greeks during the Hellenistic era
 Hipparchus invents the astrolabe
 Aryabhatta's theory on rotation of the earth
 Virtuvius work De Architectura 
 Alhazen's camera obscura, lamp experiment and lens
 Mozi's camera obscura experiments
 Antikythera mechanism and automaton robots built by ancient Greeks during the Hellenistic era
 Mean speed theorem by Oxford merton calculators
 Detonating a cloud of flour
 Ramon lull's thinking machine
 Galen's anatomical theories using animal dissection
 Foucault's pendulum
 Galileo Galilei's ball experiments, pendulum and telescope
 Heron's fountain and aeolipile
 Ibn al-Nafis' pulmonary circulation and coronary circulation
 Gyroscopic bicycle wheel
 Nylon rope trick 
 Prince Rupert's Drops
 Shooting a candle through a plank
 World's first mechanical clock by Richard of wallingford
 Using a linear motor as a gun
 Using compressed air to drive a water rocket
 Using liquid nitrogen to shatter a rose
 William Harvey's circulatory system

Note: many scientific demonstrations are potentially dangerous, and should not be attempted without considerable laboratory experience and appropriate safety precautions. Many older well-known scientific demonstrations, once mainstays of science education, are now effectively impossible to demonstrate to an audience without breaking health and safety laws. Some older demonstrations, such as allowing the audience to play with liquid mercury, are sufficiently dangerous that they should not be attempted by anyone under any circumstances.

See also 
 Demonstration (teaching)
 List of science demonstrations
 Physics Instructional Resource Association
 Science in the Age of Enlightenment
 Technology demonstration

References

Science education
Entertainment